North Down Cricket Club is an Irish cricket club based in Comber, County Down, Northern Ireland, playing in the NCU Premier League. It was founded in 1857. Currently the Club fields four Saturday/Sunday XIs, Colts XI and under-11, under-13 and under-15 sides.

Honours
Irish Senior Cup: 3
1989, 1993, 1995
NCU Senior League: 24 (1 shared)
1897, 1898, 1906, 1910, 1919, 1921, 1927, 1929, 1930, 1932, 1934, 1936, 1999, 2001, 2002, 2003, 2005 (shared), 2007, 2008, 2010, 2011, 2020
NCU Challenge Cup: 32 (1 shared)
1887, 1888, 1890, 1891, 1892, 1893, 1894, 1897, 1898, 1908, 1913, 1919, 1920, 1924, 1926, 1927, 1928, 1931, 1932, 1934, 1935, 1936, 1981, 1991, 1994 (shared), 2000, 2001, 2003, 2004, 2005, 2007, 2010
Ulster Cup: 3
2002, 2006, 2015
NCU Junior Cup: †10
†1894, †1897, †1902, †1904, †1926, †1981, †1986, †2006, †2013, †2019

† Won by 2nd XI

Notable players
 Anwar Ali
 Aniruddha Chore
 Peter Davison

References

External links
North Down Cricket Club

Cricket clubs established in 1857
Cricket clubs in County Down
1857 establishments in Ireland
Cricket clubs in Northern Ireland
Civil parish of Comber